The Westinghouse AN/GPA-35 Ground Environment (GPA-35 colloq.) was a surface-to-air missile weapons direction system for Cold War launch and steering during CIM-10 Bomarc tests.   The command guidance system manufactured by Westinghouse Electric Corporation used Bendix AN/FPS-20 Radar data to track the missile, and Lincoln Laboratory Division 6 had an "AN/GPA-35 Study Group" for integrating the AN/GPA-35 into the SAGE System. Notable launches with GPA-35 guidance included  (e.g., at the Eastern Range):

1956 October—Six launches were used to test the AN/GPA-35 capability to command BOMARC intercept of QB-17 drones.
1957 October—A BOMARC test with "live high-explosive warhead" failed when the GPA-35 commanded "faulty mid-course guidance".
1958 May 1 -- The "GPA-35 could not control the missile beyond 130 miles."
1958 August 7 -- A GPA-35 took control of an airborne BOMARC from the Experimental SAGE Sector, and the missile malfunctioned and crashed into the Atlantic Ocean.
1959 March 6 -- A straying BOMARC was self-destructed near the western boundary of the "Eglin Gulf Test Range" after a GPA-35 had transmitted the wrong commands.
1959 April 13—The GPA-35 lost control of the missile 100 seconds after launch.
1959 April 24—GPA-35 control was used for simultaneous guidance of 2 BOMARCS.

References

Aerial warfare ground equipment
Cold War military computer systems of the United States
Missile guidance